Serena Williams successfully defended her title, beating Li Na in the final, 7–5, 6–1. This was Williams' record seventh Miami title, and was Li's last tournament final before her retirement later in 2014.

Seeds
All seeds receive a bye into the second round.

Draw

Finals

Top half

Section 1

Section 2

Section 3

Section 4

Bottom half

Section 5

Section 6

Section 7

Section 8

Qualifying

Seeds

Qualifiers

Lucky losers
  Jana Čepelová

Qualifying draw

First qualifier

Second qualifier

Third qualifier

Fourth qualifier

Fifth qualifier

Sixth qualifier

Seventh qualifier

Eighth qualifier

Ninth qualifier

Tenth qualifier

Eleventh qualifier

Twelfth qualifier

References
General

Specific

2014 WTA Tour
Women's Singles
Women in Florida